Alessandro Mantovani (1814–1892) was an Italian painter, best known for his decorative frescoes and restorations.

He was born in Ferrara, and active in Rome in the restoration of the Vatican Loggie and decoration in the Palazzo Quirinale. He also worked in restoration, under Filippo Agricola, of stairwell frescoes in the Lateran Palace in Rome. One of his pupils was Prospero Piatti.

References

1814 births
1892 deaths
19th-century Italian painters
Italian male painters
Painters from Ferrara
19th-century Italian male artists